LOL (Laughing Out Loud) is a 2008 French comedy film directed by Lisa Azuelos and starring Sophie Marceau, Christa Theret, and Alexandre Astier. Written by Azuelos and Delgado Nans, the film is about a teenage girl whose life is split between her studies in a Parisian high school, her secret diary, her parents, her friends, and her boyfriends. Christa Theret received a César Award nomination for Most Promising Actress in 2010. The movie is heavily  inspired by La Boum, which starred Marceau as the teenage character. After the film's great success, several actors from the cast took part in Fort Boyard in 2009, a French TV show aimed at raising money for an association.

Plot
Lola (Christa Theret) is a teenage girl living with her mother Anne (Sophie Marceau), who is divorced from Lola's father, Alain (Alexandre Astier). Nicknamed 'LOL' by her friends, Lola has been taking her first steps into teenage romance, dating a boy from her class named Arthur (Félix Moati). Following the summer break, Arthur tells her that he cheated on her over the summer and was dating one of her friends. Lola decides to break things off with him, and starts seeing his close friend, Maël (Jeremy Kapone). Lola's friends seem to enjoy complicating matters even more. But life at home has also become impossible with her mother, Anne (Sophie Marceau). Lola attempts to play her mother and her father Alain (Alexandre Astier) off against each other for her own advantage, but what she doesn't know is that Anne and Alain have begun dating again on the sly. After a class trip to England, her relationship with her mother comes crashing down.

Cast

 Sophie Marceau as Anne
 Christa Theret as Lola
 Alexandre Astier as Alain
 Jérémy Kapone as Maël
 Marion Chabassol as Charlotte
 Lou Lesage as Stéphane
 Émile Bertherat as Paul-Henri
 Félix Moati as Arthur
 Louis Sommer as Mehdi
 Adèle Choubard as Provence
 Jade-Rose Parker as Isabelle de Peyrefitte
 Warren Guetta as David Lévy
 Jocelyn Quivrin as Lucas
 Françoise Fabian as Anne's mother
 Christiane Millet as Charlotte's mother
 Lise Lamétrie as The CPE
 Thaïs Alessandrin as Louise
 Tom Invernizzi as Théo
 Stéphanie Murat as Cathy
 Laurent Bateau as Romain
 Valérie Karsenti as Laurence
 Pierre Niney as Julien
 Jean-Claude Dauphin as The minister
 Olivier Cruveiller as Maël's father
 Katia Caballero as Maël's mother
 Vincent Jasinskij as Léon
 Patty Hannock as Madame Claude, the English teacher
 Virginie Lente as Lili
 Lisa Azuelos as The psychoanalyst

Critical response
A cultural critic writing for The Independent noted that the film portrayed British culture in the way it is stereotypically imagined by many French, showing a small town outside London where it "never stops raining. The streets are populated by middle-aged women in dowdy floral dresses carrying garish umbrellas. For dinner, the French teenagers are served white bread, marmalade and pasta – on the same plate." In France the film was well received as depicting a generation of youngsters, much as other films in the 1980s and 1990s had.

Remake

An American remake released on 4 May 2012 starring Miley Cyrus, Demi Moore, Ashley Greene, Adam Sevani, and Douglas Booth was a critical and commercial failure.

References

External links
 
 LOL (Laughing Out Loud) at uniFrance

2000s high school films
2000s teen comedy films
2008 films
Films directed by Lisa Azuelos
Films set in Paris
Films shot in London
Films shot in Paris
French teen comedy films
French high school films
2000s French-language films
2000s French films